The 1881 Atlantic hurricane season ran through the summer and early fall of 1881. This is the period of each year when most tropical cyclones form in the Atlantic basin. In the 1881 Atlantic season there were three tropical storms and four hurricanes, none of which became major hurricanes (Category 3+). However, in the absence of modern satellite and other remote-sensing technologies, only storms that affected populated land areas or encountered ships at sea were recorded, so the actual total could be higher. An undercount bias of zero to six tropical cyclones per year between 1851 and 1885 and zero to four per year between 1886 and 1910 has been estimated. Of the known 1881 cyclones, Hurricane Three and Tropical Storm Seven were both first documented in 1996 by Jose Fernandez-Partagas and Henry Diaz. They also proposed changes to the known tracks of Hurricane Four and Hurricane Five.



Season Summary 
The Atlantic hurricane database (HURDAT) recognizes seven tropical cyclones for the 1881 season. In the 1881 Atlantic season there were three tropical storms, two Category 1 hurricanes and two Category 2 hurricanes. Five of these storms were active in August and two in September. No major hurricanes, Category 3 or greater, are known for this year. Tropical Storm One impacted Mississippi in the first week of August. Later that month, Tropical Storm Two hit Corpus Christi, Texas. At the same time in mid-August, Hurricane Three, a Category 1 hurricane was active in the tropical Atlantic without making a landfall anywhere. A tropical storm developed into Hurricane Four, a Category 1 hurricane, on August 19 north-east of the Bahamas. It became extratropical on August 21. Hurricane Five was the most destructive storm of 1881. It impacted the Georgia coast on August 27 as a Category 2 hurricane and was responsible for a large loss of life. Hurricane Six was a Category 2 hurricane that uprooted trees and demolished several buildings across North Carolina and Virginia in September. The last storm of the year was Tropical Storm Seven. It was active between September 18 and September 24, to the northwest of Bermuda, without making landfall.

Timeline

Systems

Tropical Storm One 

A tropical storm formed on August 1 to the northwest of the western tip of Cuba. It tracked northward, and hit Mississippi before dissipating on August 4.

Tropical Storm Two 

A tropical storm hit Corpus Christi, Texas in the middle of August, but caused no reported deaths. Signals were blown down at the harbor, and one boat was lost.

Hurricane Three 

From August 11 to August 16, a Category 1 hurricane existed in the tropical Atlantic before turning northward and weakening. It continued northward as a tropical storm throughout August 17 and 18.

Hurricane Four 

A tropical storm developed on August 16 off the eastern coast of the Yucatán Peninsula. It tracked northeastward throughout its lifetime, passing through Cuba, the Florida Keys, and the Bahamas before becoming a hurricane on August 19. It weakened to a tropical storm on August 21 and became extratropical the same day.

Hurricane Five 

The Georgia Hurricane of 1881

A tropical storm moved westward through the northeastern Lesser Antilles on August 22. It reached hurricane strength on August 24, and continued northwestward until making landfall between St. Simons Island and Savannah, Georgia on the 27th as a Category 2 hurricane. A wind speed of 80 mph was recorded there before the anemometer was destroyed. Landfall coincided with high tide and proved very destructive as several barrier islands were completely submerged by storm surge. The hurricane moved inland, dissipating on August 29 over northwestern Mississippi. 335 people were reported as being killed in Savannah and the total death toll due to the hurricane was put at 700,
making the hurricane among the deadliest to strike the United States.

Hurricane Six 

A hurricane existed north of Hispaniola on September 7. It moved northwestward, reaching a peak of 100 mph prior to hitting southern North Carolina. The hurricane centre moved northward across the Wilmington–Wrightsville Beach area and then close to Norfolk, Virginia, before turning out to sea. Trees were uprooted and buildings demolished at both Smithville (Southport) and Wilmington. An anemometer at Wilmington indicated wind speeds of 90 mph before it was destroyed. The hurricane weakened to a tropical storm over land, bringing heavy, yet beneficial, rain to Washington and other states. It moved out to sea, dissipating near Cape Cod.

Tropical Storm Seven 

A tropical storm was first seen on September 18 to the northwest of Bermuda. It tracked to the northeast, reaching a peak of 70 mph (113 km/h) on the 19th while southeast of the Canadian Maritimes. It weakened over the north Atlantic, becoming extratropical on the 22nd and finally dissipating by September 24.

See also 

 Atlantic hurricane season
 Tropical cyclone observation
 Atlantic hurricane reanalysis project

Notes

References

External links 
 1881 Monthly Weather Review
 HURDAT Data for the 1881 Atlantic hurricane season

 
Atlantic Hurricane Season, 1881
Articles which contain graphical timelines
1881 natural disasters